The Inspiring Body of Christ Church (IBOC) is a non-denominational megachurch in Dallas, Texas, USA. The pastor is Rickie G. Rush.
A survey by Outreach Magazine in 2008 ranked the church 87th in the USA based on weekly attendance of 7,500.
The church describes itself as a "high praising, high worship, Bible believing church".

History
The church was founded and organized by Pastor Rickie G. Rush and nine others in the summer of 1990, with the first services held in October 1990.
Membership grew quickly and in 1991 the church bought its first building, formerly the former Southern Bible Institute. 
In November 2009 the church was able to move to its present location, a  facility on a  campus.
The new location has unique architectural features including a wall made up of acrylic fish tanks pierced by archways for pedestrians, with the motto "Follow me and I will make you fishers of men".

A radio ministry was implemented in 1995.
In January 2000 the church opened the IBOC Children's College for pre-schoolers, and in August 2001 opened the IBOC Christian Academy for grades 1 – 4.

See also
List of the largest churches in the USA

References

Non-denominational Evangelical churches
Churches in Dallas
Evangelical megachurches in the United States
Megachurches in Texas
Christian organizations established in 1990
1990 establishments in Texas